Shukachari is a hill place located in the hill ranges known as Mahadev Hills  between Atpadi and Khanapur of Sangli district, Maharashtra, India. As per Puran this place is believed to be the place of the epic sage Shukamuni or Shuka, son of Vyas. This is a very popular place in Atpadi taluka, people come from all the places of taluka as well as from outside. This is famous for Big Stones & Dark Forest as well as a water source in between mountains.

History 
As per tradition, this place is where ancient epic sage, Shuka vanished in stones, hence becoming his last resting place. The place where Shuka believed to be merged into stones is a cave. Around the cave a temple dedicated to Lord Shiva is built. The place Shukachari is surrounded by Mahadeva Hills and dense forests. There is a continuous flow of underground water called Ganga - Holy Water from GoMukh which is called Jivant  Zhara by faith and has a great significance in ancient Indian history. Shukachari is a resting place for Tapashcharya called Deep Meditation. The architecture of Shukachari temple suggest it was built in the 14 to 16th centuries probably in the Chalukya period.

Shukachari is situated at Khanapur & Atpadi Taluka in Sangli District. A historical place called  Banurgad or Bhupalgad fort which is situated 3 km from "Shukachari" in "Khanapur taluka" of Sangli district.

A tomb of Bahirji Naik (Shivaji's Chief of Intelligence, Indian spy, military commander and an efficient soldier, and notable Ramoshi-Berad in the army of Shivaji Maharaj in the time of the Mughal Empire) is situated at Banurgad/Bhupalgad fort in Khanapur taluka of Sangli district.

Saints from Shukachari

 Taponidhi Narayanagiri Maharaj
 Taponidhi Krishnagiri Maharaj (Locally called as Taponidhi Kisangiri Maharaj)

Ways to Reach Shukachari & Banurgad/Bhupalgad
One can reach Karad by road and by rail. From Karad one has to reach Vita via Karad-Vita road(Approximately 42 km).

From Vita reach taluka city Khanapur (approximately 22 km). From Khanapur city reach Palashi (approximately 12 km). Take Banurgad road near Palashi and reach Shukachari(approximately 2.5 km) and Banurgad (approximately 4 km). Vehicles can go up to Mahadeva temple at Banurgad/Bhupalgad fort.

Villages Situated Near Shukachari

At - Kusbawade, Post - Palashi, Taluka - Khanapur, Dist - Sangli, pincode - 415307

At - Tadachiwadi(Shukhnagar), Taluka - Khanapur, Dist - Sangli, pincode - 415307.

At - Banurgad/Bhupalgad, Taluka - Khanapur, Dist - Sangli, pincode - 415307.

At - Palashi, Taluka - Khanapur, Dist - Sangli, pincode - 415307.

Location
Its location is the border of Solapur and Sangli districts. This place is well connected by road from Atpadi, Vita, Maharashtra.

Festival 
A month-long festival is held in Indian calendar month 'Shravan', roughly falling in July–August.

Villages in Sangli district